
Taber is a surname. Notable people with the name include:

Brian Taber (born 1940), Australian cricketer
Catherine Taber (born 1979), American actress
Errol James Livingston Taber (1877–1947), Justice of the Supreme Court of Nevada
George M. Taber (born 1942), American journalist
Gladys Taber (1899–1980), American writer
Henry Taber (1860–1936), American mathematician
Isaac Walton Taber (1857–1933), American illustrator
Isaiah West Taber (1830–1912), American photographer
Jane Taber (born 1957), Canadian journalist
John Taber (1880–1965), American politician
Margaret Taber (1935–2015), American engineer and writer
Norman Taber (1891–1952), American middle-distance runner
Phoebe Taber (1834–1916), American painter
R. N. Taber (born 1945), English poet and novelist
Robert Taber (actor) (1865–1904), American actor
Robert Taber (author) (1919–1995), American author and journalist
Stephen Taber (1821–1886), American politician
Thomas Taber II (1785–1862), American politician